Lapka may refer to:
Łapka, a village in northern Poland
Lapka (river), a river in Saint Petersburg, Russia